The 2016 Asian Judo Championships were the 22nd edition of the Asian Judo Championships, and were held in Tashkent, Uzbekistan from April 15 to April 17, 2016.

Medal summary

Men

Women

Medal table

References

 Results
 Results

External links
 

Asian Championships
Asian Judo Championships
Asian Judo Championships
International sports competitions hosted by Uzbekistan
Sport in Tashkent
Asian
Judo